AeroSuperBatics Ltd is a British aerobatics and wingwalking team. They performed as the Breitling Wingwalkers from 2011 to 2018 following their sponsorship agreement with the Swiss watch manufacturer Breitling. They previously performed as Team Guinot, the Utterly Butterly Wing Walking Display Team and the Crunchie Wing Walking Display Team according to their sponsors at the time.

History 
AeroSuperBatics was founded in 1989 by veteran aerobatics pilot Vic Norman. It operates four Boeing–Stearman Model 75 biplanes and currently employs five pilots.

The team's shows currently consist of two or four planes performing aerobatic manoeuvres while female athletes, attached to a post above the wings, engage in acrobatics. The team is based at RFC Rendcomb, a private airfield near Cirencester.

Display accident
In September 2021, one of the aircraft crashed into the sea near the Sandbanks Ferry, Poole Harbour during a display at the Bournemouth Air Festival. The wing walker received minor injuries, and the pilot was unhurt. They were rescued by the owner of a nearby motorboat and the aircraft was later recovered.

References

External links

British aerobatic teams
Cirencester
Organisations based in Gloucestershire
1989 establishments in the United Kingdom